Nemorius is a genus of horse flies in the family Tabanidae.

Species
Nemorius baghdadensis Ježek, 1977
Nemorius caucasicus (Olsufiev, 1937)
Nemorius himalayensis Chvála, 1969
Nemorius irritans (Ricardo, 1901)
Nemorius oenderi Ježek, 1990
Nemorius shapuricus (Abbassian-Lintzen, 1960)
Nemorius vitripennis (Meigen, 1820)

References

Brachycera genera
Tabanidae
Diptera of Asia
Taxa named by Camillo Rondani